Manipur is a region of North-East India.  Some varieties of folk music from the area include the rural love songs Khullang Eshei, the rhythmic Lai Haraoba eshei, which contain lyrics with veiled references to erotic mysticism and pena eshei, which is accompanied by a pena, an instrument made from a bamboo rod and the shell of a gourd or coconut.  The pena is an ancient instrument that is a sort of national symbol for Manipuris.

The classical nat music performed at various special occasions, the women's devotional nupi pala songs, Gaur Padas, sung in praise of Chaitanya Mahaprabhu and dhob, sung accompanied by the jhal, a large cymbal.  Manohar Sai is another important class of songs, devoted to a 19th-century man of the same name.  Khubakeshei is a kind of song accompanied entirely by clapping.

References

 
Manipur
Culture of Manipur